Bartosz Białek (born 11 November 2001) is a Polish professional footballer who plays as a forward for Eredivisie club Vitesse, on loan from VfL Wolfsburg.

Career 
On 19 August 2020 he became a new VfL Wolfsburg player.
On 27 November 2020, he scored the final goal in a 5-3 victory at Werder Bremen Get help with editing

On 28 August 2022, Białek joined dutch Eredivisie side Vitesse on loan.

Career statistics

Notes

References

External links

Living people
2001 births
Association football forwards
Polish footballers
Zagłębie Lubin players
VfL Wolfsburg players
SBV Vitesse players
III liga players
Ekstraklasa players
Bundesliga players
Poland youth international footballers
Poland under-21 international footballers
Polish expatriate footballers
Polish expatriate sportspeople in Germany
Expatriate footballers in Germany
Polish expatriate sportspeople in the Netherlands
Expatriate footballers in the Netherlands